John Robert Bleier (born June 1, 1964) is a former American football quarterback in the National Football League. He played for the New England Patriots. He played college football for the Richmond Spiders.

References

1964 births
Living people
American football quarterbacks
New England Patriots players
Players of American football from New York (state)
Richmond Spiders football players
Sportspeople from Rochester, New York
National Football League replacement players